The Ice March (Russian: Ледяной походъ), also called the First Kuban Campaign (Russian: Первый кубанскій походъ), a military withdrawal lasting from February to May 1918, was one of the defining moments in the Russian Civil War of 1917 to 1921.  Under attack by the Red Army advancing from the north, the forces of the Volunteer Army, sometimes referred to as the White Guard, began a retreat from the city of Rostov south towards the Kuban, in the hope of gaining the support of the Don Cossacks against the Bolshevik government in Moscow.

Volunteer Army
On , not long after the Communists took control in central Russia, the Don Krug declared its independence. Novocherkassk became a haven for those opposed to the Bolshevik Revolution, and soon hosted the headquarters of the Volunteer Army, made up for the most part of former Tsarist officers, and under the command of General Mikhail Alekseyev and General Lavr Kornilov.

The Cossacks aimed primarily to defend their independence, but the Volunteers persuaded them that they could guarantee this only by joining with them in fighting against the Bolsheviks, who had the support of a large part of the non-Cossack population of the Don region.
Kornilov, now in command of some 4,000 men at Rostov, judged it pointless to attempt a defence of the city in the face of superior forces. Instead, the Volunteers made ready to re-locate to the south, deep into the Kuban, in the hope of attracting more support, though the whole area was in deep winter. Thus began the Ice March. With his defenses gone and his government in a state of collapse, Kaledin shot himself.

Kornilov's death
On 23 February, as the Red Army entered Rostov, Kornilov began the march south across the frozen steppelands.  The soldiers, carrying one rifle each, and hauling some field artillery, were accompanied by long trail of civilians from Rostov fearful of Bolshevik reprisals.  Anton Denikin, Kornilov's second-in-command, later recalled, "We went from the dark night of spiritual slavery to unknown wandering-in search of the bluebird." The bluebird was a traditional symbol of hope in Russian fairy tales and legend.  

From his four thousand men, Kornilov formed three regiments under General S. L. Markov, Colonel Nezhintsev, General Afrikan P. Bogaewsky, and a battalion under General Borovskii. Another thousand civilians accompanied the army, including the politicians V. N. Lvov, L. V. Polovtsev, L. N., Novosiltsev, and N. P. Shchetnina, plus journalists, professors, soldiers' wives, doctors and nurses.

According to Peter Kenez, "United by a boundless hatred of the enemy, the soldiers performed miracles of military accomplishment; the world had seen few armies of comparable size with greater fighting ability." On 23 February, the army entered Olginskaia for a rendezvous with Ataman Popov on 26 February. However, Popov elected to stay within the Don, while the Volunteer Army headed south towards Ekaterinodar and the Kuban. The march took them through Stavropol province and their first battle, and victory, against the Bolsheviks on 6 March at Lezhanka.  On 9 March, the army entered the Kuban, and another battle on 14 March at Berezanskaia. On 17 March, after four days of fighting, the army captured Korenovskaia, and its large cache of military supplies. On 28 March, the bitterest battle was fought against the Bolsheviks in which a number of volunteer officers froze to death crossing a small river with shallow icy water, hence the name of the campaign. By the end of March, the Volunteer Army was able to absorb Viktor Pokrovsky's Kuban Army, which had recently fled Ekaterinodar.

With his army now double in size, Kornilov decided to mount an attack on Ekaterinodar, the capital of the recently established North Caucasian Soviet Republic. Kornilov organized his army into three brigades under Markov, Bogaevskii and Erdeli. The attack, which began on 10 April, was met with heavy resistance from forces more than twice the size of the Volunteers. Kornilov was killed when an artillery shell hit the farmhouse where he had set up headquarters. Some accounts have characterized this event as "very bad luck" because shell had hit the one room where Kornilov was, killing him but not injuring anybody else present in the building.
He was succeeded in command by Denikin, who decided to abandon the assault after five days of fighting, and withdraw to the north. Hearing of the death of Kornilov, Lenin told the Moscow Soviet, "It can be said with certainty that, in the main, the civil war has ended." 

On the evening of 13 April, the Volunteer Army's forced march began in order to say the demoralized Volunteer Army, avoiding large Red forces. Denikin left 211 of his severely wounded, with doctors and nurses, at Elizavetinskaia, Diad'kovskaia, and Il'inskaia. By the beginning of May, the army had made it back to the border of the Don. According to Kenez, "The Ice March had ended. The Army, which had started the march with four thousand soldiers, had five thousand at the end of the campaign. But the greatest achievement of the march was simply survival."

Aftermath
The Volunteer Army established its headquarters in Mechetinskaia and Egorlykskaia, and established contact with Ataman Krasnov. Krasnov agreed to support the Volunteer Army with weapons and money, and take on the sick and wounded. In June, Alekseev established a political department in Novocherkassk, and Denikin published his "Goals of the Army". Amongst other points, it stated "the Germans must withdraw from the territory of Russia; the Bolsheviks  must capitulate and be disarmed..."

Memory

References
Figes, O. A People's Tragedy: the Russian Revolution, 1891-1924, 1997.
Kenez, P. Civil War in South Russia: the First Year of the Volunteer Army, 1971
Mawdsley, E. The Russian Civil War, 2005.
Alexey Tolstoy, " Road to Calvary", book two "18th year".

Notes

History of the Don Cossacks
History of Kuban
Russian Civil War
White movement